This is a list of mayors of Largo, Florida. Largo was incorporated as a town in 1905.

See also
Timeline of Largo, Florida history

References

External links
Largo Area Historical Society. From Pines and Palmettos—A portrait of Largo. page 215. The Donning Company Publishers. Virginia Beach, Va. 2005.

Largo
List of mayors